Edison Alexander Azcona Vélez (born 21 November 2003) is a Dominican professional footballer who plays as a midfielder for Major League Soccer club Inter Miami and the Dominican Republic national team.

Career

Fort Lauderdale CF
Azcona made his league debut for the club on 18 July 2020 in a 2–0 defeat to the Greenville Triumph. 
In November, 2020, Azcona was named to the USL League One All-League Second Team and was nominated for the USL League One Young Player of the Year award.
He scored three goals during his first season with the club, the second of which (a fifth-minute opener against Orlando City B) finished runner-up in the USL League One Fans' Choice Goal of the Year vote.

Inter Miami
On 26 January 2021, Inter Miami announced Azcona's signing as a homegrown player. On 2 May 2021, Azcona made his MLS debut against Nashville SC and became the first Inter Miami homegrown player to appear in an MLS match.

El Paso Locomotive (loan)
In July 2022, Azcona was loaned to USL Championship club El Paso Locomotive FC for the remainder of the 2022 season.

International career
On 28 October 2020, Azcona was called up by the senior Dominican Republic national football team. He made his international debut on 19 January 2021, as a starter in a 0–1 home friendly loss to Puerto Rico. On 25 January 2021, Azcona also started in the 0–0 home friendly against Serbia.

In March 2021, Azcona was named to the Dominican Republic squad for the 2020 CONCACAF Men's Olympic Qualifying Championship. He scored the only goal of the tournament for his country as they bowed out in the group stage.

In November 2021, he was named to the U-20 side for the 2022 CONCACAF U-20 Championship qualifying tournament in Santo Domingo. In the opening match of the tournament, Azcona scored the final goal in a 6–0 victory over Anguilla. In the final match against Saint Lucia, Azcona scored the goal that gave the Dominican Republic a 2–2 draw with Saint Lucia and a spot in next year’s 2022 Concacaf Men’s Under-20 Championship. Azcona's decisive goal in the 90+4 minute, allowed the Dominican Republic to accumulate 10 points and finish as Group B's leader, giving the host country the ticket to the next round.

References

External links
Edison Azcona en Fútbol Dominicano. Net
Edison Azcona at US Soccer Development Academy

2003 births
Living people
People from La Romana, Dominican Republic
Dominican Republic footballers
Dominican Republic international footballers
Dominican Republic emigrants to the United States
Naturalized citizens of the United States
Association football midfielders
Inter Miami CF II players
Inter Miami CF players
USL League One players
Homegrown Players (MLS)
Dominican Republic expatriate footballers
Expatriate soccer players in the United States
Dominican Republic expatriate sportspeople in the United States
American soccer players
Major League Soccer players
Dominican Republic under-20 international footballers
MLS Next Pro players
El Paso Locomotive FC players